Tirano railway station is one of two stations in Tirano, Italy. It is the southern terminus of the metre gauge Bernina line of the Rhaetian Railway from St. Moritz. Hourly services operate on this line. It is adjacent to the main-line Rete Ferroviaria Italiana Tirano railway station.

Services
The following services stop at Tirano:

 Regio: hourly service to St. Moritz.

Gallery

References

External links
 
 
 
 Webcam overlooking Piazzale Stazione, Tirano 

Railway stations in Lombardy
Rhaetian Railway stations
1908 establishments in Italy
Railway stations in Italy opened in the 20th century
Railway stations in Switzerland opened in 1908